Choi Jae-hoon (Hangul 최제훈; born 1973) is a South Korean writer. Rather than following the Korean literary tradition, he draws inspiration primarily from Western literature. His short story collection Kwireubal namjagui seong (퀴르발 남작의 성 The Castle of Baron Curval) is replete with film and pop culture references like crime fiction by Arthur Conan Doyle and Agatha Christie as well as subculture elements like the vampire, Frankenstein's monster, and cannibalism. Citing The Catcher in the Rye as his favorite book, Choi said in an interview that it is what piqued his interest in the novel and he has read all existing translations of the work into Korean.

Choi's novels have been well-received in South Korea. Kwireubal namjagui seong (The Castle of Baron Curval), in particular, was featured in the South Korean TV show The Secret Readers Club, suggesting its popular appeal and literary value.

Life 
Choi Jae-hoon was born in Seoul, South Korea in 1973. He studied business at Yonsei University and creative writing at the Seoul Institute of the Arts. He made his literary debut in 2007 when his short story “Kwireubal namjagui seong” (퀴르발 남작의 성 The Castle of Baron Curval), inspired by the character President Curval in Marquis de Sade’s 120 Days of Sodom, won the New Writer’s Award from Literature and Society. His first novel Ilgop gaeui goyangi nun (일곱 개의 고양이 눈 Seven Cat Eyes) consists of four novellas, where each plot is connected to the next like a never-ending chain and unfolds like a mystery novel. It won the 44th Hankook Ilbo Literary Award.

As a high school student, Choi was unsure of his career aspirations and chose to study business in university over the liberal arts for practical reasons. While serving his compulsory term in the South Korean military, however, he contemplated his future and decided to write because it was what he liked and did best. He set a preliminary goal of reading a hundred books during his military service, and by the end of his term he managed to read 103 titles ranging from classics by Dostoyevsky and Tolstoy to bestsellers by Haruki Murakami. When he told his friends he would become a novelist, they responded with incredulity. No one in his family had nurtured any artistic ambitions. His father, a civil servant, supposedly joked, “You really are Choi Chiwon’s descendant. It looks like those genes have finally passed onto someone, after thirty-four generations!”

After completing his military service, Choi returned to school and sat in on Korean literature and psychology classes, training to be a writer on his own. When he felt he needed to study creative writing in earnest for two or so years, he enrolled in the Seoul Institute of the Arts. After he completed his creative writing degree, he looked for a job that would ensure enough free time to write on the side. He joined a university as a staff member. He quit after four years, deciding that balancing a full-time job with a writing career was becoming difficult. He began writing full-time in 2006, submitted his works to writing contests in 2007, and made his literary debut that same year.

Writing 
Literary critic Lee Gyeong-jae likens Choi Jae-hoon's novels to a maze in which texts mirror one another and the author and reader face each other through the act of reading: “Choi Jae-hoon uses pop-culture tropes and humanities material to create narratives that effectively show ‘there is nothing outside the text.’ Moreover, each of his works are underpinned by such compelling logic and intelligence that they have an almost scientific precision. You would be hard-pressed to find any scenes in his novels that unabashedly regurgitate post-modernistic cliches everyone already knows about. Texts cannot be separated from the context in which they are placed. But as was mentioned earlier, if reality, desire, history, or other contextual issues are fundamentally linked to language, then they are also texts in themselves. This is why in Choi Jae-hoon’s fictional worlds, there are no paths leading readers outside the text.”

Another literary critic Nam Jin-wu compares Choi's maze-like narratives to M. C. Escher’s prints:

“At first glance, his novels seem like sturdy structures built on solid ground, but once inside you realize they are surrealistic mazes comprising countless rooms, corridors, doors, and staircases. When you pass through this world, which the writer has constructed with precise control, you experience time and space in a way that defies the laws of nature or causality. In this sense, Choi can be called a modernist, yet he is distinct from the aesthetic avant-garde who write free-spirited works relying on their instinctive sentimentality or sensitivity; he might thus be described has an intellectual avant-garde who writes based on constructive precisionism. He is interested in the chaos that paradoxically ensues when intellectual games are pushed to the extreme.”

Works 
1. 『나비잠』, 문학과지성사, 2013년.

From the Sleep of Babes. Moonji, 2013.

2. 『일곱 개의 고양이 눈』, 자음과모음, 2011년.

Seven Cat Eyes. Jaeum & Moeum, 2011.

3. 『퀴르발 남작의 성』, 문학과지성사, 2007년.

The Castle of Baron Curval. Moonji, 2007.

Works in translation 
 库勒巴尔男爵的城堡 (Chinese)
 Le Château du Baron de Quirval (French)
 SEPT YEUX DE CHATS (French)

Awards 
1. 2011: 44th Hankook Ilbo Literary Award

2. 2007: 7th New Writer's Award from Literature and Society

Further reading 
1. 우찬제, ｢서사도단의 서사_조하형 · 최제훈 소설의 경우｣, 『문학과사회』, 2009년 봄호.

Wu, Chan-je. “Narratives of Dead Ends: Novels by Cho Ha-hyeong and Choi Jae-hoon.” Literature and Society, Spring 2009 Issue.

2. 강지희, ｢장르의 표면장력 위로 질주하는 소설들｣, 『창작과비평』, 2011년 가을호.

Gang, Ji-hui. “Novels That Zip Across the Surface Tension of Genres.” Changbi, Fall 2011 Issue.

3. 이경재, ｢지독한 반어, 지독한 역설_최제훈 장편소설 『나비잠』｣, 『문학과사회』, 2013년 겨울호.

Lee, Gyeong-jae. “Horrific Irony, Horrific Paradox: From the Sleep of Babes, a Novel by Choi Jae-hoon.” Literature and Society, Winter 2013 Issue.

4. 강지희, ｢세계의 무표정, 회로 구성의 미학｣, 『문학과사회』, 2014년 봄호.

Gang, Ji-hui. “Expressionless World, the Aesthetics of Circuit Configuration.” Literature and Society, Spring 2014 Issue.

5. 최제훈·박성원, ｢작가인터뷰_최제훈의 숨겨진 사건｣, 『문학과사회』, 2010년 겨울호.

Choi, Jae-hoon, and Seong-won Park. “Interview with a Writer: Choi Jae-hoon’s Secret Incident.” Literature and Society, Winter 2010 Issue.

6. “The Monstrosity of an Endless Narrative: Interview with Choi Jae-hoon.” Munjang, January 2012.

http://webzine.munjang.or.kr/archives/3998

7. “‘I Saw It! I Swear I Saw the Monster...’ Interview with Choi Jae-hoon, Author of The Castle of Baron Curval.” Channel Yes

http://ch.yes24.com/Article/View/16782

8. Webzine Moonji. “May Interview for ‘Novel of the Month’ with Writer Choi Jae-hoon." YouTube, May 2010.

https://www.youtube.com/watch?v=tyckYYpgzA0

References 

Living people
1973 births
South Korean writers
21st-century South Korean writers